Roman Omelyanovych Zabzaliuk (died 9 October 2018) was a Ukrainian politician who served as an MP from 2006 to 2014.

References

1960 births
2018 deaths
Fifth convocation members of the Verkhovna Rada
Sixth convocation members of the Verkhovna Rada
Seventh convocation members of the Verkhovna Rada
All-Ukrainian Union "Fatherland" politicians
Politicians from Lviv